Geronimo Cristobal may  refer to:

 Geronimo Cristobal, (December 5, 1986–) Filipino writer and art critic.
 Geronimo Cristobal y Medina, (1860? –January 11, 1897) one of the Thirteen Martyrs of Bagumbayan.